H.M.S. Defiant (released as Damn the Defiant! in the United States) is a British naval war CinemaScope and Technicolor film from 1962 starring Alec Guinness and Dirk Bogarde. It tells the story of a mutiny aboard the fictitious ship of the title at around the time of the Spithead mutiny in 1797. It was directed by Lewis Gilbert, with a screenplay by Nigel Kneale from Frank Tilsley's novel Mutiny (1958). The film had its world premiere at the Odeon Leicester Square in London's West End on 22 February 1962.

Plot 
In 1797, the humane Captain Crawford (Alec Guinness) is in command of the frigate HMS Defiant during the French Revolutionary Wars. He soon finds himself in a battle of wills with his first officer, the sadistic and supercilious first lieutenant, Mr. Scott-Padget (Dirk Bogarde). The lieutenant believes that Crawford is too soft on his crew, and also disagrees with the captain's decision to follow his orders to sail to Corsica despite word that Napoleon's army has overrun much of Italy. Scott-Padget has powerful family connections, which he has used in the past to "beach" two previous commanding officers with whom he disagreed. Knowing that Crawford is helpless to intervene, Scott-Padget subjects the Captain's son, Midshipman Harvey Crawford (David Robinson), to excessive daily punishments so as to gain leverage over the captain.

Meanwhile, some of the crew, led by seaman Vizard (Anthony Quayle), are preparing to petition for better conditions, in conjunction with similar efforts throughout the British fleet. They eventually pledge virtually the entire crew.

In the Mediterranean, the Defiant encounters a French frigate escorting a merchant ship. After a sharp engagement, a boarding party from the Defiant captures the French frigate, and the merchantman surrenders. Crawford dispatches his son as part of the prize crew tasked to sail the captured merchantman to a British port, thereby placing him out of Scott-Padget's reach. Crawford tells Scott-Padget that bringing his son with him was a mistake, but now he's "put it right!" He further vows to take actions that will "astound" his second-in-command. Before long, Scott-Padget is confined to quarters as punishment for insubordination. His humiliation is compounded by the requirement that he appear on deck every two hours in full dress uniform, a punishment usually reserved for young midshipmen.

Soon, Defiant fights and captures a Venetian frigate, taking on many prisoners. Crawford is severely wounded in the action and eventually loses his arm. Discovered among the prisoners is a key aide to Napoleon, from whom the British learn important information about a planned invasion of Britain.

With Crawford incapacitated, Scott-Padget takes command, but his brutality goads the crew into a premature mutiny. Appealing to their patriotism, Crawford convinces Vizard and the other mutineers to sail for the main British fleet blockading Rochefort to warn them of the impending invasion. Crawford promises to intercede for the crew as best he can, on the condition that none of the officers are harmed.

As the Defiant reaches the fleet at Rochefort, they receive word that the main British fleet has already mutinied, with the Admiralty agreeing to all of the sailors' demands and granting an amnesty to those who took part. The crew's jubilation at the news is cut short when a hot-headed seaman, Evans, murders Scott-Padget. Realising that they are now all doomed to punishment as mutineers, an enraged Vizard kills Evans. Their only course now is to try to escape with the ship.

Just then, the French fleet sallies out from port, and a French fireship is sighted heading straight for the British flagship. As the only ship under sail, the Defiant has the unique opportunity to save the flagship. Once again, Crawford appeals to the crew's patriotism, making no promises but convincing them to intercept the fireship. Vizard is killed in the ensuing action, living just long enough to hear a message from the British admiral thanking Defiant for their honourable actions. The mutiny is over and HMS Defiant joins the fleet.

Cast

 Alec Guinness as Captain Crawford
 Dirk Bogarde as Lieutenant Scott-Padget
 Anthony Quayle as Vizard
 Maurice Denham as Mr. Goss (Ship's Surgeon)
 Nigel Stock as Senior Midshipman Kilpatrick
 Richard Carpenter as Lieutenant Ponsonby
 Peter Gill as Lieutenant D'Arblay
 David Robinson as Midshipman Harvey Crawford
 Robin Stewart as Midshipman Pardoe
 Ray Brooks as Hayes
 Peter Greenspan as Johnson
 Tom Bell as Evans
 Murray Melvin as Percival Wagstaffe
 Victor Maddern as Bosun Dawlish
 Bryan Pringle as Marine Sergeant Kneebone
 Johnny Briggs as Wheatley
 Brian Phelan as Grimshaw
 Toke Townley as Silly Billy
 Declan Mulholland as Morrison
 Walter Fitzgerald as Admiral Jackson
 Joy Shelton as Mrs. Crawford
 Anthony Oliver as Tavern Leader
 Russell Napier as Flag Captain
 Michael Coles as Flag Lieutenant
 Andre Maranne as Colonel Giraud
 James Bolam as Midshipman Assisting in Operation

Production
The film was known as The Patriot.

Appearance in other media
Johnny Burnette sang a tie in Damn the Defiant ballad.

Reception
Films and Filming said it was the ninth most popular movie in Britain for the year ended 31 October 1962 after The Guns of Navarone, Dr No, The Young Ones, Only Two Can Play, The Road to Hong Kong, Spartacus, The Comancheros and Blue Hawaii, and in front of The Pirates of Blood River.

References

External links

 
 
 

1962 films
1960s historical films
1962 war films
1960s adventure drama films
British war films
British historical films
Columbia Pictures films
Films set in 1797
Defiant
Films based on British novels
Films based on historical novels
Films based on military novels
Films directed by Lewis Gilbert
Films scored by Clifton Parker
Films set in the Mediterranean Sea
French Revolutionary Wars films
Napoleonic Wars naval films
Seafaring films
War adventure films
1962 drama films
1960s English-language films
1960s British films